Charles A. Johnson may refer to:

Charles Anthony Johnson (1829-1917), the head of state of Sarawak from 1868 until 1917
Charles A. Johnson (Oklahoma judge), a judge of the Oklahoma Court of Criminal Appeals
Charles A. Johnson, co-author of "Judicial Policies: Implementation and Impact" on the subject of Judicial activism
Charles A. Johnson, a colonel of the 25th New York Volunteer Infantry Regiment